Caravan is a Canadian children's television series which aired on CBC Television from 1960 to 1962.

Premise
This bilingual series featured a set that resembled a two-ring circus and recorded before an audience of approximately 700. Ringmaster Monsieur Loyal (Guy Mauffette) presented various circus acts such as animals, lion tamers and trapeze performers. Two clowns (Guy L'Ecuyer, Giani Scarpi) were also series regulars.

Production
The Montreal-produced Caravan occasionally recorded episodes in other communities in Ontario, Quebec and in 1962 the Atlantic.

Scheduling
This hour-long series was broadcast on Fridays on CBC's English network at 4:30 p.m. (Eastern) for three seasons, each from early July to September. On Radio-Canada, the French network, episodes were seen on Saturdays.

References

External links
 

CBC Television original programming
1960s Canadian children's television series
1960 Canadian television series debuts
1962 Canadian television series endings
Black-and-white Canadian television shows